Paradise Found is the fifth album by Tuck & Patti, released September 29, 1998.

Critical reception

Patricia Myers of JazzTimes writes, "In a departure from past albums, Tuck's guitar expertise and Patti’s ethereal vocals are supplemented by other musicians. Saxophonist Mark Miller and percussionist David Frazier are added to the Brazilian-flavored 'Lembrancas', and a doo-wop vocal group called The Blenders enriches Patti's pop-soul deliveries of 'All This Love' and 'Dance With Me'. Norton Buffalo plays harmonica on a funky 'You'."

Geoffrey Himes of The Washington Post wrote: "Because Andress and Cathcart are much better interpretive musicians than songwriters, this collection of cover tunes is the best vehicle they've ever had. All the songs receive nicely understated arrangements, which guard against the temptation toward gushy sentimentality. Instead, the spare settings allow Cathcart's agile alto and Andress's fleet-fingered picking to achieve that cream-skimming blend of jazz and pop influences that so many smooth-jazz artists aim for and so few reach."

Dave Hughes of All About Jazz wrote: "Tuck and Patti, guitar and vocal duo as well as husband and wife, offer up another helping of positive, optimistic musical brilliance on Paradise Found. I think they found paradise about twenty years ago, when they first began performing together. They both possess considerable chops, always utilized in exquisite taste and in perfect tandem."

Track listing

Musicians
Patti Cathcart – Vocals
Tuck Andress – Electric Guitar
Michael Bland – Drums (Tracks 5, 9, 14)
The Blenders – (Timothy Kasper, Ryan Myrold, Allan Rust, Darren Rust) – Background Vocals (Tracks 5, 9, 14)
Norton Buffalo – Harmonica (Track 10)
David Frazier – Percussion (Track 1)
Mark Miller – Soprano Sax (Track 1)
Paul Peterson – Electric Bass (Track 5, 14), Upright Bass (Track 9)
Ricky Peterson – Keyboards (Track 5, 9, 14)

Production
Producer – Patti Cathcart
Arranger – Patti Cathcart
Engineered by Tuck Andress
Assisted by Adlai Alexander
Percussion recorded at Different Fur Recording, San Francisco, CA
Engineered by Howard Johnson
Assisted by Mark Slagle
Mixed by Howard Johnson at Different Fur Recording
Additional engineering by Mark Slagle
Assisted by Justin Lieberman
"All This Love" and "Dance With Me"
Produced and Arranged by Ricky Peterson
Recorded and Mixed by Tom Tucker at Seedy Underbelly, Minneapolis, MN
Assistant Engineer – Shane Washington
Additional Recording at OarFin Studios, Minneapolis, MN
Assistant Engineers – Todd Fitzgerals and Brian Johnson
Production Assistant – Larry Osterman
"All This Love" (Remix)
Remixed by Westside Chemical (Jamie LeMoine, Tom Moloney, William Kehoe)
Assisted by Tuck & Patti
Mixed and Engineered by Howard Johnson at Different Fur Recording, San Francisco, CA
Assisted by Justin Lieberman
Original Production – Ricky Peterson
Assembled and Mastered by Howard Johnson at Different Fur Recording

Track information and credits verified from the album's liner notes.

References

External links
Tuck & Patti Official Site
Windham Hill Records Official Site

1998 albums
Windham Hill Records albums